The Newar language, officially known in Nepal as Nepal Bhasa, is a Sino-Tibetan language with a long literary history. Its prominent writers include:
 Jayaprakash Malla
 Siddhidas Mahaju
 Sukraraj Shastri
 Chittadhar "Hridaya"
 Siddhicharan Shrestha
 Dhooswan Sayami
 Durga Lal Shrestha
 Dharma Ratna Yami
 Girija Prasad Joshi
 Rebati Ramanananda Shrestha

Newar
Writers
Nepal Bhasa
1
Nepalese poets